The Brockton Veterans Affairs Medical Center,*Northampton Veterans Affairs Medical Center is a medical facility of the United States Department of Veterans Affairs (VA) at 940 Belmont Street in Brockton, Massachusetts.  Established in 1953, it is now a satellite location of the VA Boston Healthcare System, providing a variety of comprehensive and specialized care services.  The campus was listed on the National Register of Historic Places in 2022 as the Brockton VA Hospital Historic District.

History
Brockton was proposed as a site for a VA facility as early as the late 1930s, but it was not until 1949 that funding was appropriated for this facility, as part of a post-World War II expansion of services for military veterans.  Ground was broken in 1950, and the hospital opened in 1953 on land purchased by the city and given to the federal government.  Included on this property was the Howard Home for Aged Men, an elder care facility established in 1924.  At the time of its completion it was the largest and most expensive VA facility in the country, and it became one of the city's major employers.

Originally developed as a psychiatric hospital, it was expanded to provide a variety of other services.  In 1986 it was merged administratively with the West Brockton VA, and in 1999 it became part of the VA Boston Health Care System.

Campus
It has more than 20 buildings arranged on a network of internal roads, most of which date to the first decade of the hospital's operation. The layout of the buildings follows the principles of Beaux Arts design, with a cluster of large central buildings arrayed at the end of a central drive, and lower-profile ancillary and support buildings extending outward from the core.

See also
Northampton Veterans Affairs Medical Center
Bedford Veterans Affairs Medical Center
National Register of Historic Places listings in Plymouth County, Massachusetts
List of Veterans Affairs medical facilities

References

External links
Official VA website

Hospital buildings completed in 1953
Hospitals in Plymouth County, Massachusetts
Historic districts in Plymouth County, Massachusetts
Brockton, Massachusetts
National Register of Historic Places in Plymouth County, Massachusetts
1953 establishments in Massachusetts
Historic districts on the National Register of Historic Places in Massachusetts